The Lexovii (Gaulish: *Lexsouioi, 'the leaning, lame'), were a Gallic tribe dwelling immediately west of the mouth of the Seine, around present-day Lisieux, during the Iron Age and the Roman period.

Name 
They are mentioned as Lexovii (var. Lexobii) and Lexovios by Caesar (mid-1st c. BC), Lēxobíous (Ληξοβίους) and Lēxooúioi (Ληξοούιοι) by Strabo (early 1st c. AD), Lexovios (var. lexobios, lixouios) by Pliny (1st c. AD), and as Lēxoubíōn (Ληξουβίων; var. Λειξουβίων) and Lēxoúbioi (Ληξούβιοι; var. Λιξούβιοι) by Ptolemy (2nd c. AD).

The ethnic name Lexovii is a latinized form of the Gaulish ethnonym *Lexsouioi (sing. Lexsouios), which means 'leaning', possibly 'lame' (cf. Old Irish losc, 'lame'). It is a derivative of the adjective *leksu- ('oblique'; cf. Greek λοξός). An exact parallel has been highlighted in the Welsh llechwedd ('slope'), itself derived from an earlier *lexsouíiā. Given the semantic connotation of the name, Lexovii was probably an exonym, meaning that it was given by outsiders to this tribe.

The city of Lisieux, attested ca. 400 AD as civitas Lexoviorum ('civitas of the Lexovii', Loxovias in 614, Lisiue in 1024), and the region of Lieuvin, attested in the 6th c. as Luxoviensis (pagus Lisvinus in 802, Liévin in 1155), are named after the Gallic tribe.

Geography 
At the time of the Gallic Wars (58–50 BC), the Lexovii were part of the civitates Aremoricae.

Their chief town was Noviomagus (modern Lisieux).

History 
When the Veneti and their neighbours were preparing for Julius Caesar's attack (56 BC), they applied for help to the Osismii, Lexovii, Namnetes, and others. (B. G. iii. 9, 11.) Caesar sent Quintus Titurius Sabinus against the Unelli, Curiosolites, and Lexovii, to prevent their joining the Veneti. A few days after Sabinus reached the country of the Unelli, the Aulerci Eburovices and the Lexovii murdered their council or senate, as Caesar calls it, because they were against the war; and they joined Viridovix, the chief of the Unelli. The Gallic confederates were defeated by Sabinus, and compelled to surrender. (B. G. iii. 17–19.) The Lexovii took part in the great rising of the Galli against Caesar (52 BC); but their force was only 3000 men. (B. G. vii. 75.)

Religion 
In Berthouville were found three coins engraved with the name of a Gallo-Roman god Mercurius Canatonnessis (Mercurio Kanetonnessi, M[ercurio] C[anetonnessi], Merc[urio] Can[e]t[onnessi]).

At the border of the civitas of the Lexovii and Viducasses, in Jort (ancient *Divo-ritum, named after the *Diva river), was found a bronze stylus found carved with the name of the Celtic god Toutatis (Toutati).

References

Bibliography 

 

</ref>

 
Historical Celtic peoples
Gauls
Tribes of pre-Roman Gaul
Tribes involved in the Gallic Wars
Lisieux